The Basketball Cup, for sponsorship reasons the TOTO Basketball Cup and formerly the NBB Cup, is an annual cup competition for Dutch basketball teams organised by the Basketball Nederland. Every team in the Netherlands can participate by signing up for the preliminary rounds. Professional basketball teams from the Dutch Basketball League (DBL) enter the tournament in the fourth round. From 1977 until 1990 professional teams were not allowed to participate in the competition.

The tournament is organized in a knock-out format, with quarter- and semi-finals being two-legged series while the final is played in a single game. Heroes Den Bosch and Donar are the two clubs with the most cup titles, as both clubs have won 7 titles each. During the 2020–21 season, the tournament was not played and was replaced by the DBL Cup, featuring only the twelve DBL teams.

Format
In the first, second and third round teams from the Dutch second, third and fourth division participate. From the fourth round, teams from the Dutch Basketball League (DBL) enter the competition. Quarter- and semi-finals are played in a two-legged format. When a team form a tier lower than the DBL played a DBL team, one win is sufficient for the latter to advance to the next round.

Finals
From 1986 to 1993, the final was played over two legs with both finalists playing one game at home and one game away. From 2005 to 2013, the venue was fixed as the Topsportcentrum in Almere hosted the final every year.

Performances by clubs
Teams in italic are inactive or dissolved, teams in bold currently play in the BNXT League (the highest level league of basketball in the Netherlands). Four teams active at the highest level have won the Dutch Cup, namely Heroes Den Bosch, Donar, ZZ Leiden and BAL.

Statistics

Finals top scorers

Teams with a * next to their name lost the finals.

References

  
Basketball competitions in the Netherlands
Basketball cup competitions in Europe